Església de Sant Julià i Sant Germà  is a church located in Avinguda Verge de Canòlic, 30, Sant Julià de Lòria, Andorra. It is a heritage property registered in the Cultural Heritage of Andorra. It was built originally in the 12th century and underwent renovation in the 18th and 20th centuries.

References

Sant Julià de Lòria
Roman Catholic churches in Andorra
Cultural Heritage of Andorra